The New Zealand journalist Shayne Currie (born 1 April 1971) is editor of The New Zealand Herald newspaper, an Auckland-based newspaper with the highest circulation of any newspaper in the country.

Previous career 

Currie began his journalistic career as a teenager at The Evening Post in Wellington, where he won the national award for crime reporting. He subsequently worked on newspapers including The Press in Christchurch and The Sunday Star-Times, which were all part of the same media group, Independent Newspaper Limited (INL), ultimately owned by Australian newspaper magnate Rupert Murdoch. Currie was at The Sunday Star-Times when Murdoch sold his New Zealand newspaper holdings to John Fairfax Holdings, another Australian newspaper publishing company.

Currie rose to deputy editor at the Star-Times, then New Zealand's highest-circulating paper. After Suzanne Chetwin resigned as Star-Times editor in 2003, Currie led the newspaper in an acting capacity until the appointment of Cate Brett as editor. He has won numerous journalism awards.

In July 2004 he resigned from the Star-Times to work on a special project for APN News & Media, a rival media group that owned The New Zealand Herald and a range of provincial newspapers, magazines and radio stations. That special project was subsequently revealed as the Herald on Sunday, another Sunday newspaper. Currie was appointed deputy editor to Suzanne Chetwin.

Editorship 

Currie took up the editorship of the Herald on Sunday on 1 February 2005, again succeeding Chetwin.

On 8 August 2005, he addressed the 2005 PANPA annual conference in Cairns, Australia, on how launching a newspaper can change an entire market. He spoke shortly after Kevin Rudd, subsequently elected prime minister of Australia.

Under his leadership, the Herald on Sunday has been the only major newspaper in New Zealand to consistently increase its circulation, selling 93,665 papers each week in the audit period ended June 2008.

When the figures were published, Currie said: "In the three years since the launch of the Herald on Sunday, the newspaper has found its voice, attracting new Sunday newspaper buyers to what is the most competitive newspaper market in the country. We owe a huge debt to those who stuck with us in our early days, and to those readers who have picked us up for the first time, or more frequently, over the past 12 months. We've listened to what readers liked – and didn't like – and evolved accordingly."

On 9 May 2008, Currie accepted the Qantas Award for Newspaper of the Year for the Herald on Sunday. The judges said the award was an extraordinary achievement for a paper that had been launched only four years' earlier.

In August 2008, the Nielsen Media Research National Readership Survey showed the Herald on Sunday had increased its readership by 64,000 to 390,000 – a 19.6 per cent jump in the 12 months to 30 June 2008.

Currie has gained a strong reputation as an advocate of open and transparent media, and as a critic of the cash bidding wars that can characterise popular newspaper and magazine journalism elsewhere in the New Zealand media and overseas.

Controversy 
During his time as acting editor of The Sunday Star-Times, Currie defended one of his journalists who was charged with the theft of a videotape pertaining to a drug case involving a teacher and pupils. On an evening in September 2003, one of Currie's reporters took a group of young people to dinner and drinks at the cost of the newspaper. Later in the night, two of the male youths stole the video from the teacher after at least one of them performed oral sex on the teacher, a court heard. Currie was quoted at the time saying the Sunday Star-Times had acted properly. "The newspaper at all times was acting in good faith in a matter of extreme public interest", he said. "As a result of the newspaper's work, a teacher has been charged with supplying teenagers with a class A drug. We believe we have done everything right in this matter – we handed the videotape to the police before we published anything so that they could carry out their own investigation."

The Herald on Sunday has also earned the nickname of "Car Crash on Sunday" among some journalists and media observers for its frequent use of vehicle accidents and human tragedies as marketing tools on its front page.

Later, in October 2005, as editor of the Herald on Sunday, Currie discovered that one of his staff reporters, John Manukia, 38, had fabricated an interview with former south Auckland police officer Anthony Solomona. Currie dismissed Manukia and gave an upfront public apology. Further investigations revealed that Manukia had fabricated other material at the Herald on Sunday and as a reporter at another newspaper, the Fairfax-owned Sunday News.

Currie wrote a candid first-person article in the Herald on Sunday of 23 October 2005, explaining what had happened and expressing his regret to readers. He drew comparisons with the actions of reporters Jayson Blair at The New York Times, and Stephen Glass at The New Republic.

In 2009 Currie was sued by a former assistant editor of the Herald on Sunday for unjustified dismissal. Reporter Stephen Cook, who helped Currie launch the tabloid, was sacked in 2008 after two drug squad detectives visited the Herald on Sunday offices looking for him. Cook had reportedly been seen at an address which was under police surveillance. On the day that the case commenced, Currie faced further scrutiny when The New Zealand Herald revealed examples of industrial espionage, including allegations that he had sent a reporter to the rival Sunday Star-Times''' print site to obtain advanced copies in a bid to get stories for his own paper. The allegations were again reported in the Sunday News and Sunday Star-Times,'' branded "unprecedented spying". Currie, and APN, won the employment case after the court found Cook's dismissal was justified because he could not adequately explain why he was at the address under surveillance.

Awards 
In 2015, Currie was awarded a fellowship to Wolfson College, Cambridge, as part of the 2015 Canon Media Awards.

References 

Living people
1971 births
New Zealand editors
New Zealand women editors
New Zealand journalists
New Zealand women journalists
New Zealand magazine editors
Women magazine editors
Place of birth missing (living people)